Destroy the Plastique Man is the second album by As Fast As. Singer Spencer Albee stated regarding the album's recording process, "If at any point I felt we were just doing things automatically, I would stop the process and put the song away. I wanted to make a record that was completely outside of our comfort zone. One that would not only surprise listeners, but ourselves as well. I think we achieved that goal."

Track listing
"Hey Kids!" - 0:29
"Homewrecker" - 4:01
"Beakless Bird (Jerking Off In A Paper Cup)" - 3:22
"Sleighjacking" - 4:06
"Your Lips To God's Ears" - 4:11
"Me Ow (Nobody Knows)" - 4:14
"Destroy the Plastique Man" - 4:39
"The Road To Hell" - 3:00
"What A Shame (Delicious Shame)" - 5:27
"Somebody's Fool" - 3:11
"Dancing a Murderous Tango" - 3:37
"Can I See You Tomorrow?" - 4:42
"For My Life" - 3:37

Notes

2008 albums
As Fast As albums